Marvin James Penton (born April 27, 1932) is a professor emeritus of history at the University of Lethbridge in Lethbridge, Alberta, Canada and the author of three books on the history of Jehovah's Witnesses. Although raised in the religion, he was expelled in 1981 on the grounds of apostasy after criticizing some of the teachings and conduct of the religion's leadership. His expulsion gained national media attention and prompted one of several schisms that year among Jehovah's Witnesses.

Background
Born in April 1932, Penton was raised as a fourth-generation Jehovah's Witnesses, experiencing as a child Canadian government restrictions on the religion's activities. He was baptized in June 1948 and was sent by his parents to Arizona because of ill health. Penton attended Amphitheater High School in Tucson, Arizona. He married Marilyn Mae Kling when they were both 19 (circa 1951). In 1953-1956 he attended the University of Arizona, majoring in History with minors in German and Spanish. He received his Bachelor of Arts (B.A.) in 1956. In 1956-1959 he attended the University of Iowa, studying Medieval History and serving as a research and teaching assistant. He received his Master of Arts (M.A.) in European History in 1959. In 1965, he received his Doctor of Philosophy (Ph.D.) in Latin American History with a minor in Religious Studies, from the University of Iowa.

Over the years, Penton served in various capacities in Jehovah's Witness congregations in the United States, Puerto Rico and Canada while pursuing an academic career, before moving to Alberta in 1965. Penton claimed to be an anointed Christian, and therefore one of the religion's faithful and discreet slave class, which is said to be collectively used by Jesus Christ to "feed" his followers with scriptural instruction.

Dissent
While serving as an elder in his Lethbridge congregation in the late 1970s, he developed concerns over the Watch Tower Society’s emphasis on the requirement for Witnesses to engage in public preaching work and what he saw as a growing harshness and intolerance in the treatment of members of the religion by those in authority.

On August 10, 1979, he sent an eight-page letter to the society detailing his concerns. He opened the letter by saying he would "write lovingly but candidly about what I believe to be the central problem in our organization – the thing which has sickened it and for which the Governing Body as such must take much direct responsibility".

 
Penton gave examples of what he claimed were distortions of New Testament texts to support Watch Tower Society teachings on house-to-house preaching, criticized the appointment of elders chiefly on the basis of field service records and described circuit overseer visits as "military inspections". He also sought a re-emphasis on justification by faith.

The letter, which was distributed among some Witnesses in Lethbridge, prompted accusations from within the organization's hierarchy that Penton was denigrating and opposed to the preaching work and resulted in pointed talks by the circuit and district overseers in Lethbridge warning that anyone who suggested the religion’s Governing Body had made "lots of mistakes" about the issue was lying, "blaspheming the organization" and trying to destroy it. One overseer told an assembly: "Woe betide the man that would speak evil against the representatives of God. He may become like Miriam and stricken with leprosy and he might lose his life." Another overseer said those who suggested the Governing Body were wrong were "unrighteous people" who would die at God's judgment day. Author James Beverley observed: "It is not often that preachers use the threat of leprosy to keep the flock in line." He said most informed Witnesses in Lethbridge would have guessed that the comments were directed chiefly against Penton.

Penton resigned as an elder in December 1979, but a day later withdrew the resignation. He received a one-page reply to his letter from the society's headquarters in January 1980 that urged him to adjust his viewpoint or remain silent.

Despite his protests that he was the subject of a witch hunt and injustice because of expressing his view about a religion he had once hailed as a "champion of free speech", Penton was disfellowshipped, or expelled, from Jehovah's Witnesses on the grounds of apostasy in February 1981. His expulsion triggered a schism among Lethbridge Witnesses, as 80 supporters–about a quarter of all local members–severed ties or were expelled from the religion. The events surrounding his expulsion gained widespread media attention including national television coverage and were the subject of a 1986 book, Crisis of Allegiance, by James A. Beverley, an assistant professor at Atlantic Baptist College in Moncton, New Brunswick, Canada.

Books

Jehovah’s Witnesses in Canada: Champions of Freedom of Speech and Worship
While still a member, he wrote Jehovah’s Witnesses in Canada: Champions of Freedom of Speech and Worship (1976), a history of the religion's struggle for religious freedom under Canadian law, in which he claimed that much of the political and theological attacks on the Watch Tower Society had been grossly unfair. He subsequently appeared on a national current affairs television program in Canada defending the religion's doctrines and denying its leaders were guilty of false prophecy. The book gained brief mentions in the society's magazine The Watchtower (quoting a Toronto Star review) and three years later in a Yearbook article about the Witnesses' history in Canada, although Penton later wrote that he found it curious that the society refused to quote directly from it or otherwise mention it in publications or conventions. "As a result," he wrote, "some Witnesses manifested direct hostility towards it. On occasions I was openly criticized by particularly narrow Witnesses with 'trying to make money on the brothers' or 'trying to make a big fellow out of myself'."

Apocalypse Delayed: The Story of Jehovah's Witnesses

He began work on Apocalypse Delayed: The Story of Jehovah's Witnesses soon afterwards, but halted his research and writing in 1979 after developing concerns over what he viewed as a growing punitive response of the religion's leadership to doctrinal dissent from within its ranks. He resumed work on the book after his expulsion and it was published in 1985.

Jehovah's Witnesses and the Third Reich: Sectarian Politics under Persecution

In 2004 he published Jehovah's Witnesses and the Third Reich: Sectarian Politics under Persecution, which highlights what he claims are discrepancies between the religion's official history of its opposition to Nazism during World War II and documented facts (see Persecution of Jehovah's Witnesses in Nazi Germany). Penton describes that the Witnesses have attempted to rewrite their previous history under the Nazi government by concealing early overtures to Adolf Hitler and sidelining the group's antisemitism. The failure of those efforts and the persecution by the government, Penton states resulted in the Witnesses in 1933 going back to their earlier position of opposing the Nazis. Historian Detlef Garbe, director at the Neuengamme (Hamburg) Memorial, criticized Penton's "new theory" that in the 1930s the Watch Tower Society had "adapted" to National Socialism's anti-semitic aggression. Garbe suggested Penton's interpretation reflected a "deep-seated aversion" against his former religion and that "from a historiographic viewpoint Penton's writings perhaps show a lack of scientific objectivity". 

Scholar Kevin P. Spicer states that Penton considers statements by leader Joseph Rutherford and the Witnesses as important toward understanding their attempts at dealing with the Nazi government (early 1930s) by distancing the group from Jews and altering their pro-Jewish position. Shortcomings of the book are described by Spicer that it is over reliant on published collections and secondary sources and has an absence of sources from the German archive. Spicer states however that without downplaying the resistance to Nazism by the Witnesses, "Penton has alerted the reader to the reality that the Jehovah's Witnesses, like most Christians, embraced some form of nationalism and anti-Semitism, especially in the early years of Hitler's reign." In historian Leon Stein's review of Garbe's work on Jehovah’s Witnesses in the Third Reich, he considers it wide ranging, but Penton's work as more critical on the topic.

Other works

Penton has also edited two journals, written five articles about Jehovah's Witnesses and also wrote the Canadian Encyclopedias entry about the religion.

Published works

(1976) Jehovah’s Witnesses in Canada: Champions of Freedom of Speech and Worship. (Macmillan, Toronto). .

(2004)  Jehovah's Witnesses and the Third Reich: Sectarian Politics under Persecution. (University of Toronto Press, Toronto). .

References

External links 
 - interview

1932 births
Living people
People disfellowshipped by the Jehovah's Witnesses
Academic staff of the University of Lethbridge